The Children and Young Persons (Sale of Tobacco etc.) Order 2007 is a statutory instrument issued by the United Kingdom government on 7 March 2007 which raised the minimum age for buying tobacco in England and Wales from 16 to 18, taking effect on 1 October 2007. The introduction of this change was the subject of a major government publicity campaign.

See also 
 Smoking in the United Kingdom

References

External links

2007 in British law
Statutory Instruments of the United Kingdom
Smoking in the United Kingdom